Njen is a minor Southern Bantoid language of Cameroon, spoken by the residents of the village of Njen. Many Njen residents also speak Moghamo and Ashong, the dialects of neighbouring villages.

References

Momo languages
Languages of Cameroon